Carolyn Jean Cheeks Kilpatrick (born June 25, 1945) is a former American politician who was U.S. Representative for  from 1997 to 2011. She is a member of the Democratic Party.  In August 2010 she lost the Democratic primary election to Hansen Clarke, who replaced her in January 2011 after winning the 2010 general election. Kilpatrick is also the mother of former Detroit Mayor Kwame Kilpatrick.

Early life, education and career

Born Carolyn Jean Cheeks in Detroit, she graduated from Detroit High School of Commerce. She then attended Ferris State University in Big Rapids from 1968–70 and earned a B.S. from Western Michigan University (Kalamazoo) in 1972. She earned a M.S. from the University of Michigan in 1977. She worked as a high school teacher and was later a member of the Michigan House of Representatives from 1979-96.

U.S. House of Representatives

Committee assignments
Committee on Appropriations
Subcommittee on Transportation, Housing and Urban Development, and Related Agencies

Caucus and other membership
Canada-United States Inter-Parliamentary Group
Congressional Black Caucus
Congressional Progressive Caucus

She was one of the 31 House Democrats who voted not to count the 20 electoral votes from Ohio in the 2004 presidential election. Republican President George Bush won the state by 118,457 votes.

On December 6, 2006, the Congressional Black Caucus unanimously chose Kilpatrick as its chairwoman for the 110th Congress (2007-8).

On September 29, 2008, she voted against the Emergency Economic Stabilization Act of 2008.

Political campaigns
In 1996, Kilpatrick challenged three-term incumbent Barbara-Rose Collins in the 1996 Democratic primary for what was then the 15th District.  She defeated Collins by a shocking margin, taking 51.6 percent of the vote to Collins' 30.6 percent.  This was tantamount to election in this heavily Democratic, black-majority district.  She was reelected six times, never dropping below 80 percent of the vote.  Her district was renumbered as the 13th District after the 2000 Census.  She faced no major-party opposition in 2004 and was completely unopposed in 2006.

2008

Her first serious opposition came during the 2008 primary—the real contest in this district—when she was challenged by both former State Representative Mary D. Waters and State Senator Martha Scott in the Democratic primary. Kilpatrick's campaign was plagued by the controversy surrounding her son and his involvement in a text messaging sex scandal. On the August 5 primary election, Kilpatrick won with 39.1 percent of the vote, compared to Waters' 36 percent and Scott's 24 percent.

2010

In 2010, she was again challenged in the Democratic primary.  Unlike in 2008, her opposition coalesced around State Senator Hansen Clarke, who defeated her in the August 3 primary. “This is the final curtain: the ending of the Kilpatrick dynasty,” said Detroit political consultant Eric Foster of Foster, McCollum, White and Assoc.
 NPR and CBS News both noted that throughout her re-election campaign, she was dogged by questions about her son, Kwame Kilpatrick, who is in prison on numerous corruption charges. Michigan Live reported that her election defeat could in part be attributed to the Kwame Kilpatrick scandals.

Personal life
Kilpatrick was married to Bernard Nathaniel Kilpatrick, with whom she has daughter Ayanna and son Kwame Kilpatrick, a former Mayor of Detroit. Carolyn Cheeks Kilpatrick divorced Bernard Kilparick in 1981. She has five grandsons including two sets of twins and one granddaughter.  Both her former husband and son were on trial, under an 89-page felony indictment.  On March 11, 2013, her son was found guilty on 24 of 30 federal charges and her former spouse was found guilty on 1 of 4 federal charges.

 She is a member of the Detroit Substance Abuse Advisory Council.
 She is a member of Delta Sigma Theta sorority

Electoral history

See also

 List of African-American United States representatives
 Women in the United States House of Representatives

References

External links
 
Michigan Democratic Party
13th Congressional District at Michigan Liberal
The Political Graveyard

|-

|-

|-

|-

|-

|-

1945 births
20th-century Methodists
20th-century American politicians
20th-century American women politicians
21st-century American politicians
21st-century American women politicians
African-American members of the United States House of Representatives
African-American Methodists
African-American state legislators in Michigan
African-American women in politics
Methodists from Michigan
Democratic Party members of the United States House of Representatives from Michigan
Female members of the United States House of Representatives
Ferris State University alumni
Living people
Democratic Party members of the Michigan House of Representatives
People of the African Methodist Episcopal church
Politicians from Detroit
University of Michigan alumni
Western Michigan University alumni
Women state legislators in Michigan